Desiree Ortiz is a Venezuelan television host. Currently hosting "Show Business", on air in fourteen countries through the Venevisión network, Venevisión Plus and Mega TV.

Venevision (Ruge Manía) and Fox Sports were part of the journalist's early work.

Early life
She lived and worked in Spain, Mexico, Costa Rica, Colombia, Argentina and the United States. After commuting between Los Angeles and Miami, she settled down in the United States. In 2006, she acted as host for SKY Latin America's coverage of the 2006 FIFA World Cup, leading to her image being broadcast across the region.

She has also acted as hostess for Fashion TV in Bogotá, Colombia, covered the Mar del Plata music festivals in Argentina for On DirecTV, Mexico's TV Azteca's Sports, Univision's Control, France-Cannes Festival and The Fox Sports Awards.

Desiree has been featured in advertising campaigns for Miu Miu, 7 Up, Telefónica Movistar, Ferrero Rocher, EFE Ice Cream, Fiz, Mulco, Colgate (toothpaste), Armandeus hair stylists among others. Desiree currently is the host of Latin Angel Special, a television show dedicated to the beauty of women, gastronomy and tourism.

References

Living people
Actresses from Caracas
Universidad Santa María (Venezuela) alumni
Venezuelan female models
Venezuelan television presenters
Venezuelan women journalists
Venezuelan women television presenters
Year of birth missing (living people)